Denique Monai Graves (born September 16, 1975) is a former professional basketball player. She played for the Sacramento Monarchs in the Women's National Basketball Association's first season.

College
Graves left Howard as its  fifth all-time leading scorer and fourth all-time leading rebounder.

Personal life
At Howard Graves made the Dean's List three years and earned a bachelor's degree in Science. She graduated in 2008. She joined Keystone College's women's basketball coaching staff in 2012.

References

External links
Denique Graves WNBA Stats | Basketball-Reference.com
Graves, Denique - Who's Who Among African Americans | Encyclopedia.com

1975 births
Living people
African-American basketball players
American expatriate basketball people in China
American women's basketball coaches
American women's basketball players
Basketball coaches from Pennsylvania
Basketball players from Philadelphia
Centers (basketball)
Howard Bison women's basketball players
Jiangsu Phoenix players
Sacramento Monarchs players
21st-century African-American sportspeople
21st-century African-American women
20th-century African-American sportspeople
20th-century African-American women
20th-century African-American people